Bob Truluck (born July 28, 1949) is an American crime and noir novelist. In 1999, Truluck won the St. Martin's Press/Private Eye Writers of America Award for Best First Private Eye Novel. In 2001, he received the Shamus Award for Best First Private Investigator Novel. He has also been nominated for a Barry Award and 2 Anthony Awards.

Bibliography

Duncan Sloan series

Other novels

Short stories

Awards 
 Winner: 1999 Private Eye Writers of America/St. Martin's Press - Best First Private Eye Novel Contest, for Street Level
 Winner: 2001 Shamus Award (Best First P.I. Novel), for Street Level
 Nominee: 2001 Anthony Award (Best First Mystery Novel), for Street Level
 Nominee: 2001 Barry Award (Best First Novel), for Street Level
 Nominee: 2003 Anthony Award (Best Short Story), for A Man Called Ready
 Nominee: 2016 Hammett Prize, for The Big Nothing

References

External links 
 

Living people
1949 births
American crime fiction writers
American male novelists
Shamus Award winners
20th-century American novelists
American male short story writers
20th-century American short story writers
21st-century American novelists
21st-century American short story writers
20th-century American male writers
21st-century American male writers